Daniel Zygmunt Wełna (born 3 December 1955 in Bydgoszcz) is a Polish sprint canoer who competed in the late 1970s and early 1980s. He won seven medals at the ICF Canoe Sprint World Championships with two golds (K-4 500 m and K-4 1000 m: both 1977), two silvers (K-2 500 m: 1981, K-4 1000 m: 1979), and three bronzes (K-2 1000 m: 1981, K-4 500 m: 1978, 1979).

Wełna also competed in two Summer Olympics, earning his best finish of fourth in the K-4 1000 m event at Moscow in 1980.

References

External links
 
 

1955 births
Canoeists at the 1976 Summer Olympics
Canoeists at the 1980 Summer Olympics
Living people
Olympic canoeists of Poland
Sportspeople from Bydgoszcz
Polish male canoeists
ICF Canoe Sprint World Championships medalists in kayak